Luigi Miradori (c. 1600-1610 - c. 1656) was an Italian painter of the Baroque period, active mainly in Cremona.

Miradori was born in Genoa, thus also called il Genovese or Genovesino. He was a pupil of the painter Panfilo Nuvolone or il Tanzio or Pietro Martire Neri. In Cremona, he painted a Virgin in Glory for church of San Clemente in Cremona; and a Massacre of Innocents for the church of San Lorenzo. He painted an Execution of the Conspirators, once in the Casa Borri in Milan. He painted a Story of San Rocco for the Cathedral of Cremona, a St John the Damascene & the Madonna (1648) for the church of Santa Maria Maddalena, a Rest on the Flight into Egypt for the church of St. Imerio, and a Miracle of the bread & fishes and a Last Supper for the Palazzo Comunale. In the Cremonese Seminary he painted a Birth of San Carlo Borromeo (1642) and in the Museo Civico Ala Ponzone there are 11 paintings. An exhibition of Miradori paintings was held in the Ala Ponzone in 2018.

References

1656 deaths
17th-century Italian painters
Italian male painters
Italian Baroque painters
Painters from Cremona
Year of birth unknown